Franz Bernhard Humer (born 1 July 1946) is a Swiss-Austrian businessman, and the former chairman of Diageo, and of Roche.

Business career
Humer was CEO of Swiss pharmaceutical company Roche, and was chairman from 2008 to 2014.

He was  chairman of Diageo, a British multinational alcoholic beverages company, until January 2017, when he was succeeded by Javier Ferrán.

Humer was chairman of Reed Elsevier from July 2008 to September 2010, when he was succeeded by Anthony Habgood.

Philanthropy

Humer is chairman of the International Centre for Missing & Exploited Children, a global non-profit organization that combats child sexual exploitation, child pornography, and child abduction. Humer was chairman at the INSEAD school of business from 2008 to 2014.

References

1946 births
Living people
Swiss businesspeople
Austrian businesspeople
Austrian chairpersons of corporations
British corporate directors
Swiss chairpersons of corporations
Diageo people
Hoffmann-La Roche people